San Juan Regional Medical Center is a 198 bed, Level III Trauma Center that provides healthcare to the Four Corners region of New Mexico, Arizona, Utah and Colorado, in the United States. In October 2010, SJRMC received a three-year accreditation by Det Norske Veritas (DNV).

References

External links
Official website

Farmington, New Mexico
Hospitals in New Mexico
Buildings and structures in San Juan County, New Mexico
Hospitals established in 1910
1910 establishments in New Mexico Territory